This is a list of the National Register of Historic Places listings in Menominee County, Michigan.

This is intended to be a complete list of the properties and districts on the National Register of Historic Places in Menominee County, Michigan, United States. Latitude and longitude coordinates are provided for many National Register properties and districts; these locations may be seen together in a map.

There are 10 properties and districts listed on the National Register in the county.



|}

Former listings

|}

See also

 List of Michigan State Historic Sites in Menominee County, Michigan
 List of National Historic Landmarks in Michigan
 National Register of Historic Places listings in Michigan
 Listings in neighboring counties: Delta, Dickinson,  Marquette, Marinette (WI)

References

Menominee County
Menominee County, Michigan
Buildings and structures in Menominee County, Michigan